The 2019–20 Perth Glory FC season was the club's 23rd season since its establishment in 1996. The club participated in the A-League for the 15th time, the FFA Cup for the sixth time and the AFC Champions League for the first time.

On 24 March 2020, the FFA announced that the 2019–20 A-League season would be postponed until further notice due to the COVID-19 pandemic in Australia and New Zealand, and subsequently extended indefinitely. The season resumed on 17 July 2020. Similarly, the 2020 AFC Champions League competition has been suspended until at least mid-September 2020 in West Zone. The AFC Executive Committee agreed to played AFC Champions League East Zone matches which are now scheduled to be played between November 15 and December 13, 2020 in Qatar.

Players

Transfers

From youth squad

Transfers in

Transfers out

Contract extensions

Squad statistics

Appearances and goals

{| class="wikitable sortable plainrowheaders" style="text-align:center"
|-
! rowspan="2" |
! rowspan="2" |
! rowspan="2" style="width:180px;" |Player
! colspan="2" style="width:87px;" |A-League
! colspan="2" style="width:87px;" |FFA Cup
! colspan="2" style="width:87px;" |AFC Champions League
! colspan="2" style="width:87px;" |Total
|-
!
!Goals
!
!Goals
!
!Goals
!
!Goals
|-
|1
|GK
! scope="row" | Tando Velaphi

|0
|0

|0
|0

|0
|0

!0
!0
|-
|2
|DF
! scope="row" | Alex Grant

|7
|0

|0
|0

|0
|0

!7
!0
|-
|3
|DF
! scope="row" | Jacob Tratt

|0+3
|0

|1
|0

|0
|0

!4
!0
|-
|4
|DF
! scope="row" | Gregory Wüthrich

|8
|0

|0
|0

|0
|0

!8
!0
|-
|5
|DF
! scope="row" | Ivan Franjic

|6
|1

|1
|0

|0
|0

!7
!1
|-
|6
|DF
! scope="row" | Dino Djulbic

|1+2
|0

|0
|0

|0
|0

!3
!0
|-
|7
|FW
! scope="row" | Joel Chianese

|4+3
|0

|1
|0

|0
|0

!8
!0
|-
|8
|DF
! scope="row" | James Meredith

|4
|0

|0
|0

|0
|0

!4
!0
|-
|9
|FW
! scope="row" | Bruno Fornaroli

|8
|3

|1
|0

|0
|0

!9
!3
|-
|12
|DF
! scope="row" | Kim Soo-beom

|3+4
|0

|0
|0

|0
|0

!7
!0
|-
|13
|DF
! scope="row" | Osama Malik

|0
|0

|0
|0

|0
|0

!0
!0
|-
|13
|DF
! scope="row" | Osama Malik

|4
|0

|0
|0

|0
|0

!4
!0
|-
|14
|FW
! scope="row" | Chris Harold

|0+3
|0

|1
|0

|0
|0

!4
!0
|-
|15
|MF
! scope="row" | Brandon Wilson

|1
|0

|1
|0

|0
|0

!2
!0
|-
|16
|DF
! scope="row" | Tomislav Mrcela

|1
|1

|1
|1

|0
|0

!2
!2
|-
|17
|MF
! scope="row" | Diego Castro

|8
|1

|0+1
|0

|0
|0

!9
!1
|-
|18
|FW
! scope="row" | Nicholas D'Agostino

|0+1
|0

|1
|0

|0
|0

!2
!0
|-
|19
|MF
! scope="row" | Chris Ikonomidis

|8
|2

|0
|0

|0
|0

!8
!2
|-
|20
|MF
! scope="row" | Jake Brimmer

|0+2
|0

|1
|0

|0
|0

!3
!0
|-
|21
|FW
! scope="row" | Trent Ostler

|0
|0

|0
|0

|0
|0

!0
!0
|-
|23
|DF
! scope="row" | Dane Ingham

|0
|0

|0
|0

|0
|0

!0
!0
|-
|27
|MF
! scope="row" | Juande

|8
|0

|0
|0

|0
|0

!8
!0
|-
|28
|FW
! scope="row" | Gabriel Popovic

|0+2
|0

|0
|0

|0
|0

!2
!0
|-
|29
|MF
! scope="row" | Kristian Popovic

|1+3
|1

|0
|0

|0
|0

!4
!1
|-
|33
|GK
! scope="row" | Liam Reddy

|8
|0

|1
|0

|0
|0

!9
!0
|-
|88
|MF
! scope="row" | Neil Kilkenny

|8
|0

|1
|0

|0
|0

!9
!0
|}

Disciplinary record

Clean sheets

Pre-season

Friendlies

Competitions

Overview
{|class="wikitable" style="text-align:left"
|-
!rowspan=2 style="width:140px;"|Competition
!colspan=8|Record
|-
!style="width:30px;"|
!style="width:30px;"|
!style="width:30px;"|
!style="width:30px;"|
!style="width:30px;"|
!style="width:30px;"|
!style="width:30px;"|
!style="width:50px;"|
|-
|A-League

|-
|FFA Cup

|-
|AFC Champions League

|-
!Total

FFA Cup

A-League

League table

Results summary

Result by round

Matches

Finals series

AFC Champions League

Group stage

Footnotes

References

Perth Glory FC seasons
2019–20 A-League season by team